Dominique Mercy (born 1950)  is a French contemporary dancer. He has been a member, since 1974, of the Tanztheater Wuppertal company of Pina Bausch as well as a choreographer in his own right.

Biography
Dominique Mercy received his education in classical dance. After a stay in the United States, he met Pina Bausch (1940-2009) in 1972. She invited him to join her recently created contemporary dance company in Germany, with which he has remained since 1974.

He co-created some of the dance corps choreography and pieces. He became one of the most famous contemporary dancer and received a Bessie Award in 2002 for his performance in Masurca Fogo.

Together with Bausch's assistant Robert Sturm, he was elected unanimously by the ensemble in place of Pina Bausch in October 2009.

Major choreographies

As interpreter
 1974: Iphigénie en Tauride
 1975: Orfeo ed Euridice
 1978: Café Müller 
 1980: Bandoneon
 1983: Nelken - Carnations
 1989: Palermo, Palermo
 1995: Danzón
 1997: Der Fensterputzer - The Window Cleaner
 1998: Masurca Fogo 
 1999: Petit psaume du matin (Little morning psalm) written for Dominique Mercy by Josef Nadj.

As choreographer
 Pina Bausch assistant for a major part of the creations since 1974.
 2000: Ça ira mieux demain written for Guesch Patti

Documentary film
Dominique Mercy dances Pina Bausch by Régis Obadia, France, 2003, 52 min., producer: arte, video clip and Cafe Müller

References

External links 
Dominique Mercy's homepage, Folkwang Hochschule (German)
Bausch works her magic in Paris, The New York Times, June 17, 2005
Hopelessly devoted to you, The Independent, January 26, 1999

1950 births
French choreographers
French male dancers
Living people
Contemporary dancers